Fort Decatur was an earthen fort established in March 1814 on the banks of the Tallapoosa River as part of the Creek War and the larger War of 1812. The fort was located on the east bank of the Tallapoosa River, near the modern community of Milstead. Fort Decatur was also located near the Creek town of Tukabatchee. It was most likely named for Stephen Decatur.

History

Creek War
Colonel Homer Milton, the commanding officer of the 3rd Regiment, ordered the construction of Fort Decatur and Fort Burrows after leaving Fort Hull in March 1814. Fort Burrows was located across the Tallapoosa River from Fort Decatur. Benjamin Hawkins assisted Milton in surveying the site of Fort Decatur. The fort was built under the command of Lieutenant Colonel Richard Atkinson. After pursuing Red Sticks in southeast Alabama, Davy Crockett (a member of Major William Russell's Tennessee Mounted Volunteers) was stationed at Fort Decatur. Fort Decatur was planned to supply General Andrew Jackson in his march from Fort Williams to Hickory Ground, but flooding prevented the supplies from arriving. After the Battle of Horseshoe Bend, Georgia and South Carolina troops under the command of Major General Thomas Pinckney marched from Fort Decatur to Fort Jackson. Brigadier General Joseph Graham commanded troops at Fort Decatur who repaired roads and assisted in supplying Jackson's army after the Battle of Horseshoe Bend. After regular troops terms of service were up, the Tennessee militia was garrisoned at Fort Decatur. The militia was then replaced by troops from Georgia who were requested by General Pinckney to oppose any potential British or Creek offensive.

William McIntosh and Thomas Simpson Woodward were both temporarily stationed at Fort Decatur.

Postwar
In 1815, President James Madison appointed Colonel John Sevier to the United States Boundary Commission to survey the boundary between the United States and the Creek Nation. The Commission was headquartered at Fort Decatur. On September 24, 1815, Sevier died and was buried at Fort Decatur. Sevier's remains were reinterred at the Knox County Courthouse in Knoxville on June 15, 1889.

A post office operated under the name Fort Decatur from 1839 to 1859.

Present
Today, the fort site is marked by a historical marker that was placed by the Alabama Anthropological Society in 1931. The remains of the fort are located on the grounds of Auburn University's E.V. Smith Research Center.

Units
The 4th Regiment of East Tennessee Militia and a battalion of West Tennessee Militia were both stationed at Fort Decatur. The 7th North Carolina Militia was garrisoned at Fort Burrows and Fort Decatur.

Gallery

References

Sources
 
 
 
 
 
 
 
 
 
 

Decatur
Decatur
Creek War
Pre-statehood history of Alabama
Buildings and structures in Macon County, Alabama
Decatur
Decatur